Earl Shorris (Chicago, 25 June 1936 – New York City, 27 May 2012) was an American writer and social critic. He is best known for establishing the Clemente Course in the Humanities, named after baseball great and humanitarian Roberto Clemente. The Clemente Course is an "educational institution founded in 1995 to teach the humanities at the college level to people living in economic distress." He was critical of Western culture as "sliding towards plutocracy and materialism." It promotes employment, personal agency and social inclusion building up "ideas of hope, meaning, and identity into the personal" lives and narratives of participants.

Shorris published extensively on Mexico and Mexican history. Shorris made the acquaintance of Miguel León-Portilla, who published a widely-read anthology of accounts of the conquest of the Aztec Empire from Aztec viewpoints, The Broken Spears. The two subsequently published an important anthology of Mesoamerican literature, bringing to a mass market the existence of significant body of writings by indigenous Mexicans.
In 2000, Shorris was awarded the National Humanities Medal.

Bibliography
The Death of the Great Spirit: An Elegy for the American Indian (1973)
The Oppressed Middle : Politics of Middle Management : Scenes from Corporate Life Anchor Press/Doubleday (1981) 
A Nation of Salesmen: The Tyranny of the Market and the Subversion of Culture W. W. Norton (1994) 
Under the Fifth Sun: A Novel of Pancho Villa W. W. Norton (1980) 
Jews Without Mercy: A Lament Anchor Books/Doubleday (1982)
Riches for the Poor: The Clemente Course in the Humanities W. W. Norton & Company (2000) 
In the Yucatan: A Novel W. W. Norton & Company (2000) 
In the Language of Kings: An Anthology of Mesoamerican Literature, Pre-Columbian to the Present (with Miguel León-Portilla). W.W. Norton & Company 2002 
The Life and Times of Mexico W. W. Norton & Company (2004) 
The Politics of Heaven: America in Fearful Times W. W. Norton & Company (2007) 
The Art of Freedom: Teaching the Humanities to the Poor W. W. Norton & Company (2013) 
American Vespers Harper's Magazine Dec. 2011

References

External links
 The Clemente Course in the Humanities
 interview with Shorris

1936 births
2012 deaths
American male writers
National Humanities Medal recipients